Verne Swain refers to three steamboats built by the Swain Shipyard of Stillwater, Minnesota. Swain built the first one in 1886, the second one in 1904, and the last one in 1913.

First Verne Swain
The first Verne Swain was a steamboat built by David Swain of Stillwater, Minnesota, and put into packet service between Clinton, Iowa and Davenport, Iowa by Swain in 1886.

In 1889, John Streckfus purchased the Verne Swain from the Swain Shipyard in Stillwater, Minnesota for $10,000. Verne Swain had a cargo deck, a passenger deck, and a Texas deck. The boat was propelled by two side-mounted paddlewheels. This was his first steamboat acquisition for the Acme Packet Company of Rock Island, Illinois. He ran Verne Swain on daily service, leaving each morning from Clinton, Iowa at 7am, with arrivals scheduled for Davenport, Iowa at 10am. The return trips started from Davenport at 3pm scheduled to arrive at the home port at 8:15pm.

in 1891, Eagle Packet Company purchased the Verne Swain and commenced packet service between Peoria, Illinois and St. Louis.

in 1900, Dixon Brothers of Peoria, Illinois acquired the Verne Swainand  
renamed it Speed.

Second Verne Swain
Also built at the Swain Shipyard in Stillwater, the second Verne Swain was designed for excursion. Completed in 1904, the second Verne Swain was a sternwheeler with a wooden hull ordered for running excursions from Peoria, Illinois to the World's Fair in St. Louis. The steamer was passed through various owners while serving Mississippi and Tennessee. The ship sunk in August 1929 at Dismal Point, Arkansas.

Third Verne Swain
In 1913, Swain Shipyard completed the last known steamboat to be named, Verne Swain. First running on the Illinois River as an excursion boat, Captain Fred Hornbrook acquired Verne Swain in 1918 to deploy the 186-foot sidewheeler as a packet between Wheeling, West Virginia and Pittsburgh, Pennsylvania. Later, Verne Swain was sold and reassigned to excursions.

The steamer persisted long enough to be renamed Rose Island, Roosevelt, and City of Memphis.

References

Further reading
 Kathryn Strand Koutsky and Linda Koutsky (2006). "Boat Days." Minnesota Vacation Days. Afton, Minnesota: Minnesota Historical Society Press.

External links
 Side wheeler Verne Swain snapshot Indiana History Room Archives, New Albany-Floyd County Public Library.
 Verne Swain (Packet, Excursion boat, 1913-1929) UW La Crosse Historic Steamboat Photographs.

Steamboats of the Mississippi River
Paddle steamers of the United States
Steamboats of the Ohio River
Ships built in Minnesota
1889 ships